Enzo Vito Gabriel Crivelli (born 6 February 1995) is a French professional footballer who plays as a forward for Swiss Super League club Servette.

Crivelli made his professional debut with Bordeaux in 2014, and went on to make over 50 appearances for the club over the course of the next two-and-a-half years. In August 2016, he joined Bastia on a season-long loan, before signing permanently for Angers the following year. Following a spell at Caen, Crivelli joined Turkish side İstanbul Başakşehir, where he also was sent on loan to Antalyaspor and Saint-Étienne. In 2022, he signed for Servette in Switzerland.

He is also a former youth international, and was the joint-top goalscorer at the 2015 Toulon Tournament in which France were crowned champions.

Club career

Bordeaux

Early career
Born in Rouen, Crivelli progressed through the academy of Cannes, before joining Bordeaux in 2012. In his debut season for the club, he helped the U19 team to victory in the 2013 Coupe Gambardella. He then made his Ligue 1 debut on 26 January 2014 against Saint-Étienne, replacing Abdou Traoré after 83 minutes in a 2–0 home win. His second appearance came two months later, in a home game against Nice. Crivelli signed his first professional contract with Bordeaux in May 2015. Just days after signing the contract, he scored his first league goal for Les Girondins in a 1–1 draw with Lyon.

2015–16 season
Crivelli scored his first Europa League goal for Bordeaux on 27 August 2015, in a 2–1 defeat to Kairat. It was a vital strike, as it gave Bordeaux an away goal, which helped them progress to the group stages of the competition. He followed his Europa League heroics by scoring his first goal of the 2015–16 Ligue 1 campaign in a 1–1 draw with Toulouse on 20 September. Three days later, in a clash against Nice, he set up Jaroslav Plašil for the opening goal, before being sent off in the 50th minute. Bordeaux went on to lose the match 6–1. In November, Crivelli added two more goals to his tally, scoring in a 2–2 draw with Rennes, before netting a late consolation goal in a 4–1 defeat to Caen. The strike against Caen was Crivelli's final goal for the season, as he failed to find the back of the net in the second half of the campaign, ultimately ending with a return of 3 goals in 29 league appearances.

2016–17 season: Loan to Bastia
On 3 August 2016, Bordeaux simultaneously announced that Crivelli had signed a one-year extension on his contract with the club and that he would be spending the upcoming season on loan at fellow Ligue 1 side Bastia. He made his debut for the club on 12 August 2016, in a 1–0 loss to reigning Ligue 1 champions Paris Saint-Germain. Crivelli scored his first goals for the club the following week, netting a brace in a 3–0 win over Lorient. He also missed from the penalty spot during the match. On 24 September, Crivelli scored the only goal in a 1-0 win over Guingamp. Three minutes later, he was sent off for a second bookable offence and received a four-match ban from the LFP Disciplinary Committee, as a result. He ended the season with 10 goals in 24 appearances, though his return was not enough to prevent Bastia from being relegated to Ligue 2.

Angers
On 27 June 2017, Crivelli signed a four-year deal with fellow Ligue 1 side Angers. He scored on his debut for the club on 12 August, netting in a 2–0 Ligue 1 win over Amiens.

Caen 
On 31 January 2018, Crivelli was loaned to Caen until the end of the season with an option to buy based on Caen's survival in Ligue 1.

On 9 June 2018, Caen activated the option to buy for around €3 million.

İstanbul Başakşehir
On 27 July 2019, Crivelli joined the Turkish club İstanbul Başakşehir.

On 31 January 2022, Crivelli signed for Ligue 1 side Saint-Étienne on loan until the end of the season. A purchase option was included in the deal.

International career
In June 2015, Crivelli took part, and was victorious in the Toulon Tournament with the France national under-20 football team. He scored four goals during the tournament and was named joint-top goalscorer, alongside Morocco's Achraf Bencharki.

Personal life
Crivelli was born in France, to an Algerian-born Pied-Noir father, and is of Italian and Algerian descent.

Career statistics

Honours
İstanbul Başakşehir
Süper Lig: 2019–20
France U20
Toulon Tournament: 2015
Individual
Toulon Tournament Top Scorer: 2015

References

External links

 

1995 births
Living people
Footballers from Rouen
Association football forwards
French footballers
France youth international footballers
France under-21 international footballers
French expatriate footballers
Expatriate footballers in Turkey
French expatriate sportspeople in Turkey
Expatriate footballers in Switzerland
French expatriate sportspeople in Switzerland
French people of Italian descent
French sportspeople of Algerian descent
Ligue 1 players
Süper Lig players
Swiss Super League players
FC Girondins de Bordeaux players
SC Bastia players
Angers SCO players
Stade Malherbe Caen players
İstanbul Başakşehir F.K. players
Antalyaspor footballers
AS Saint-Étienne players
Servette FC players